Michael Dorsey may refer to:
Michael K. Dorsey, environmental expert
J. Michael Dorsey, American attorney and administrator
Michael Dorsey, former name of Michael Takahashi (born 1974), Japanese-American basketball player
Michael Dorsey, fictional actor in the movie Tootsie

See also
Mike Dorsey (1930–2014), English-born Australian actor